Mir Jan may refer to:
Mohamed Jawad
Mirjan